Chandler Elizabeth Quarles (née, Roberts; born July 24, 1990) is an American Christian musician, who plays Christian pop style of contemporary worship music. She has released two independently-made extended plays, Art from the Ashes (2012) and The Color EP (2016).

Early and personal life
Chandler Elizabeth Roberts was born on July 24, 1990, in Conroe, Texas, the daughter of Robert Lee and Susan Elizabeth Roberts (née, Beams), while she was raised in nearby Houston, Texas, with her two younger sisters. She graduated from high school in her hometown in 2008, soon thereafter relocating to Nashville, Tennessee to attend Belmont University, where she graduated with her baccalaureate in commercial voice in 2012.

Roberts works for Fair Trade Services, where she is their national promotions manager.<

Music career
She started her music recording career in 2012, by releasing the extended play, Art from the Ashes, on February 14, 2012. Her subsequent extended play, The Color EP, was released on February 26, 2016.

Discography
EPs
 Art from the Ashes (February 14, 2012)
 The Color EP (February 26, 2016)

References

External links
 

1990 births
Living people
American performers of Christian music
Musicians from Houston
Musicians from Nashville, Tennessee
Singer-songwriters from Texas
Singer-songwriters from Tennessee
American women singer-songwriters
American electronic musicians
21st-century American singers
21st-century American women singers